Frailea pumila is a species of Frailea from Brazil, Argentina, and Uruguay.

Gallery

References

External links
 
 

pumila